Ennerdale and Kinniside is a civil parish in the Borough of Copeland, Cumbria, England.  It contains four listed buildings that are recorded in the National Heritage List for England.  All the listed buildings are designated at Grade II, the lowest of the three grades, which is applied to "buildings of national importance and special interest".  The parish is in the Lake District National Park, and contains the settlements of Ennerdale Bridge and Croasdle, but most of it consists of countryside, moorland and mountain.  The listed buildings comprise a house, a farmhouse and stable, a packhorse bridge, and a telephone kiosk.


Buildings

References

Citations

Sources

Lists of listed buildings in Cumbria